Ángel López may refer to:

Ángel López Jiménez (born 1955), Spanish astronomer
Ángel López (footballer, born 1981), Spanish footballer
Ángel López (footballer, born 2003), Spanish footballer
Ángel López Pérez (born 1983), Spanish football manager
Ángel López (rugby union) (born 1992), Spanish rugby union player